Dougan a food variety popular in China. Dougan may also refer to
Dougan Round Barn in Beloit, Wisconsin, United States 
Houghtaling & Dougan, an American architectural firm 
Dougan (surname)